Nvidia 3D Vision is a technology developed by Nvidia, a multinational corporation which specializes in the development of graphics processing units and chipset technologies for workstations, personal computers and mobile devices. This technology allows games, movies and pictures to be displayed in stereoscopic 3D.

To play the following in 3D, as well as convert over 650 existing games, requires Nvidia 3D Vision Glasses with a 120 Hz monitor, or red and cyan glasses with slower monitors, Windows Vista or later, enough system memory (2GB recommended), a compatible CPU (Intel Core 2 Duo or AMD Athlon X2 or higher) and a compatible Nvidia video card (some GeForce 200 series ones or later). Since releasing the technology in 2009, by the end of 2013 only about 40 games appeared certified as "3D Vision Ready", while other have noticeable defects in the 3D image.

3D Vision Ready games

3D Vision Ready demos

Other games
In addition to NVIDIA's official list of titles, there is an independently developed stereoscopic 3D games database that is put together by end users. Featuring a rules based certification grade and numeric Quality Assurance score, GameGrade3D (GG3D) details required game settings and expected visual anomalies (if any).

See also

List of 3D PlayStation 3 games
List of Wii U games
List of Xbox 360 games with 3D support
List of stereoscopic video games
Nvidia 3D Vision

References

External links
 3D Vision games at GeForce.com
 "Game with NVIDIA 3D Vision" - NVIDIA's list of games supported by NVIDIA 3D Vision

Nvidia
N